Hartmaniellidae is a family of polychaetes belonging to the order Eunicida.

Genera:
 Hartmaniella Imajima, 1977

References

Polychaetes